Jobson is a surname. Notable people with the surname include:

Alexander Jobson (1875–1933), Australian Army Brigadier General
Eddie Jobson (born 1955), English musician
Edward Jobson (1855–1909), English cricketer
Francis Jobson, MP for Colchester
Frederick James Jobson (1812–1881), painter, architect and Wesleyan Methodist minister
Gary Jobson, Australian sailor
Isabella Jobson (1878–1943), Australian nurse who served in World War I
Jack Jobson (footballer) (1900–1983), English footballer
Jasmine Jobson (born 1995), English actress
Jóbson Leandro Pereira de Oliveira (born 1988), Brazilian footballer
Liesl Jobson, South African poet and musician
Marci Jobson (born 1975), American soccer player
Matt Jobson (born 1980), Australian rugby league player
Nancy Jobson (1880–1964), Australian teacher and headmistress
Richard Jobson (explorer), seventeenth-century English explorer
Richard Jobson (footballer) (born 1963), English
Richard Jobson (television presenter) (born 1960), Scottish singer-songwriter and film-maker, best known as a TV presenter
Walter Jobson, MP
Wayne Jobson (born 1954), Jamaican record producer